It is the debut studio album by English rock band Pulp, released on 18 April 1983 by Red Rhino Records.

Release and aftermath

It was originally released as a limited vinyl mini-LP of 2.000 copies in April 1983. The album's odd title is in fact a deliberate pun, as when it added to the name of the band it spells the word "Pulpit".

The first reissue on CD was by Cherry Red in February 1994 with three bonus tracks ("Looking for Life", "Everybody's Problem" and "There Was..."). However, this release was soon deleted as Cherry Red did not own the material. Later that year Fire Records made its own re-release in November 1994, but without "Everybody's Problem" and "There Was..." as bonus tracks. The album existed in this form for all subsequent releases.

The album was reissued and remastered by Fire Records in 2012 along with Pulp's 1987's Freaks and 1992's Separations. This re-release took several delays as the first stated release date was 8 August 2011 while the albums finally came out on 13 February 2012. An announcement in the interim stated that the albums would be remastered with new bonus tracks to be added to the track listings as well as new artwork and liner notes from music journalist Everett True.

Track listing
All songs written by Jarvis Cocker, except where noted.

Side 1
"My Lighthouse"  – 3:30
"Wishful Thinking" – 4:17
"Joking Aside" – 4:20
"Boats and Trains" – 1:34

Side 2
"Blue Girls" – 5:56
"Love Love" – 3:09
"In Many Ways" – 2:46

Bonus tracks
Fire Records 1994 reissue
"Looking for Life"  – 5:29

Fire Records 2012 reissue
"My Lighthouse"  – 3:28
"Please Don't Worry" – 3:24
"Blue Girls"  – 6:05
"Sink or Swim" – 4:02

Personnel
Pulp
 Jarvis Cocker: Vocals, guitar
 Simon Hinkler: Bass, piano, guitar, mandolin
 Peter Boam: Guitar, keyboards, piano
 David Hinkler: Keyboards, trombone
 Wayne Furniss: Guitar, bass
 Garry Wilson (credited as "Beefy Garry O"): Drums 

Additional musicians
 Mister Barry Thompson: flute, clarinet 
 Jill Taylor: backing vocals
 Saskia Cocker: backing vocals
 Jon Short: cello
 Joanne, Julie and Alison: chatter and recorders

Artwork
 Tony Perrin

References

External links

It at YouTube (streamed copy where licensed)
 

Pulp (band) albums
1983 debut albums
Red Rhino Records albums
Cherry Red Records albums
Fire Records (UK) albums